CKB Commerce College or Chandra Kamal Bezboruah Commerce College is a government-aided educational institution in Jorhat, in the Indian state of Assam. The college was established under founder principal Madhab Chandra Chakrabarty and promoted by the Jorhat Education Society with a vision of providing education in Trade, Industry, and Commerce. A Bachelor of Commerce degree is expected to take three years.

The college has day and night shifts. The day shift is open to both male and female students, but the night shift is restricted to male students.

The college celebrated its golden jubilee in 2018 year with the successful completion of 50 years of service.

Departments
 School of Management
 Accountancy/ Tax procedure & practice
 Marketing
 Banking & Monetary Management
 Economics & Human Resource Management
 Commerce
 Statistics & Mathematics
 Computer Applications
 English
 Assamese
 Bengali
 Hindi

Courses
The college offers under-graduate instruction in the following courses:

 Two year Higher Secondary Course (HSC) of Assam Higher Secondary Education Council (AHSEC).
 Three year Degree Course (TDC) in commerce (both Major and Pass course) from Dibrugarh University (B.Com)
 Three year Bachelor of Business Administration (BBA) Course from Dibrugarh University

Major fields
The college offers degrees in the following subjects:
 Accounting & Finance
 Marketing
 Banking and Monetary Management
 Human Resource Management

Vocational courses
A student can take any one of the following subjects in lieu of Business Economics, Business Statistics & Mathematics, Economics Environment of Business and Entrepreneurship. A student studying a major cannot opt for vocational subjects.

 Computer applications
 Tax procedure & practice

Other facilities
Besides imparting regular course of Commerce Education, the college also provides the following facilities:

Library 
The college library offers computers and free WiFi access. A digital classroom is available.

Career-oriented courses
The college provides facilities of some UGC (University Grants Commission of India) sponsored job oriented add-on courses in professional management. The courses are:
 Accounting & Tax practices.
 Computer Applications
 Marketing & Sales Management

Coaching scheme
The college provides some UGC sponsored remedial coaching scheme for SC/ST students and also coaching for the same for entry into service.

IGNOU Study Centre
A study centre of Indira Gandhi National Open University is running in the college having as many as 27 programs including MBA, M.Com, M.LIS and MCA.

I.C.G.C.
The college provides information and counselling to local unemployed youth in addition to its students for self-employment through its Information and Career Guidance Cell.

I.A.A. branch
The college has a branch of Indian Accounting Association (affiliated to International Associations for Education & Research, New York), an academic forum for promoting research and development in the field of accounting.

See also
List of accredited colleges in Assam

References

External links
Official website of CKB Commerce College

Educational institutions established in 1965
Universities and colleges in Assam
Colleges affiliated to Dibrugarh University
Jorhat
Commerce colleges in India
1965 establishments in Assam
Education in Jorhat district